Xiphinema brevicolle is a plant pathogenic nematode infecting mangoes.

See also 
 List of mango diseases

References

External links 
 Nemaplex, University of California - Xiphinema brevicolle

Agricultural pest nematodes
Mango tree diseases
Longidoridae